Soutar is a surname. It has Scottish origins.  Notable people with the surname include:

Alan Soutar (born 1978), darts player
Sir Charles Soutar (1920–2016), RAF air marshal and doctor
Derek Soutar (born 1981), footballer
Fabian Soutar, rugby player
Farren Soutar (1870–1962), actor and singer 
John Soutar, (1881–1951) British architect
Robert Soutar (1830–1908), actor, comedian, stage manager, writer and theatre director 
 Tom Soutar (1893–1981), professional athlete and Australian rules footballer
William Soutar (1898–1943), poet

See also
Souter
Souttar

References 

Surnames of Scottish origin